South Cadbury is a village in the civil parish of South Cadbury and Sutton Montis, in the South Somerset council area of the English county of Somerset. The parish includes the village of Sutton Montis.

It is famous as the location of the hill fort of Cadbury Castle, thought by some to be King Arthur's Camelot.

History

The name Cadbury means Cada's fort and refers to Cadbury Castle, which is immediately to the south west of the village. It is a vast Iron Age hill fort covering an area of around 20 acres (8 ha). The site has seen human occupation from Neolithic times until the late Saxon period. It was famously partially excavated by Leslie Alcock in the 1960s, when, amongst other things, an Arthurian period feasting hall was discovered. Since John Leland made reference to local traditions of a connection with King Arthur in the 16th century, there has been widespread speculation that this was the location of Camelot. King Arthur's Well sits at the foot of the hill and the local public house, the Red Lion, was renamed The Camelot when it was remodelled in 2004.

In the Domesday Book of 1086 the manor is recorded as held by Turstin FitzRolf.

The parish was part of the hundred of Catsash.

Governance

The parish council has responsibility for local issues, including setting an annual precept (local rate) to cover the council's operating costs and producing annual accounts for public scrutiny. The parish council evaluates local planning applications and works with the local police, district council officers, and neighbourhood watch groups on matters of crime, security, and traffic. The parish council's role also includes initiating projects for the maintenance and repair of parish facilities, as well as consulting with the district council on the maintenance, repair, and improvement of highways, drainage, footpaths, public transport, and street cleaning. Conservation matters (including trees and listed buildings) and environmental issues are also the responsibility of the council.

The village falls within the Non-metropolitan district of South Somerset, which was formed on 1 April 1974 under the Local Government Act 1972, having previously been part of Wincanton Rural District. The district council is responsible for local planning and building control, local roads, council housing, environmental health, markets and fairs, refuse collection and recycling, cemeteries and crematoria, leisure services, parks, and tourism.

Somerset County Council is responsible for running the largest and most expensive local services such as education, social services, libraries, main roads, public transport, policing and fire services, trading standards, waste disposal and strategic planning.

It is also part of the Somerton and Frome county constituency represented in the House of Commons of the Parliament of the United Kingdom. It elects one Member of Parliament (MP) by the first past the post system of election.

Geography

The village lies just south of the main A303 road from London to the south-west of England, which runs through the north of the civil parish. As well as South Cadbury itself, the parish includes the village of Sutton Montis to the south of Cadbury Hill. This is one of three large hills in the centre and south-eastern portion of the parish, the others being Littleton Hill and the Beacon. There is a hill fort on Cadbury Hill and a disused quarry on Littleton Hill. South Cadbury is part of the Castle Cary ward, which elects one councillor to Somerset County Council.

Religious sites
The South Cadbury parish church of St Thomas à Becket is dedicated to Thomas Becket. It largely dates from the 13th and 15th centuries, but was widely restored in 1874. Many of the fittings date from this time. However, it does boast a 15th-century roof, with angel brackets and carved bosses, and an early wall painting of St Thomas. The church is a Grade II* listed building. The 18th century poet and satirist, Charles Churchill was at one time curate at South Cadbury.

Sutton Montis parish church is dedicated to the Holy Trinity. It has Saxon origins and includes surviving work of the 12th century. It is a Grade I listed building.

Notable residents
 Herbert Pitman (1877–1961), Merchant Navy Officer and third officer on the RMS Titanic.

References

External links

Villages in South Somerset
Former civil parishes in Somerset